John Douglas Coughran (born September 12, 1951) is a former American professional basketball player. During his playing career, at a height of 2.01 m (6'7") tall, he played at the small forward and power forward positions.

Early life and high school career
Coughran was born in Pittsburg, California, in September 1951. He attended Piedmont Hills High School, in San Jose, California, where he also played high school basketball.

College career
After high school, Coughran played college basketball at the University of California, with the Golden Bears, from 1969 to 1973.

Professional career
After college, Coughran was drafted from the University of California, in the fifth round of the 1973 NBA draft, with the 74th overall pick, by the Cleveland Cavaliers. He played one season in the National Basketball Association (NBA), with the Golden State Warriors, during the 1979–1980 season.

He also played in Spain's top level league, the Primera División, where he was the league's top scorer, in the 1973–74 season. With Real Madrid, he won the FIBA European Champions Cup (EuroLeague) championship of the 1977–78 season. With Real Madrid, he also won the 1976, 1977, and 1978 editions of the FIBA Intercontinental Cup.

He also played in Italy's top level league, the LBA, with Stella Azzurra.

References

External links
 
 RealGM.com Profile
 Italian League Profile 
 NCAA College Stats

1951 births
Living people
American expatriate basketball people in Spain
American men's basketball players
Basketball players from California
California Golden Bears men's basketball players
Cleveland Cavaliers draft picks
Golden State Warriors players
People from Pittsburg, California
Power forwards (basketball)
Real Madrid Baloncesto players
Small forwards